The South County Opportunity for the Purpose of Education (SCOPE) program is an alternative High School program, housed at the Witzel Learning Center in Mehlville, St. Louis County, Missouri. It is part of the Mehlville School District.

References

External links
Mehlville School District website

High schools in St. Louis County, Missouri
Public high schools in Missouri
Buildings and structures in St. Louis County, Missouri